Thomas Sanchez (born 1943) is an American novelist.

Life 
Thomas Brown Sanchez is an American writer descendant of Spanish immigrant gamblers and Portuguese cattlemen dating back five generations to the Californias Gold Rush. He was born at the Oakland Naval Hospital in Oakland, California three months after his father was killed in the South Pacific Battle of Tawara during World War II.

EARLY YEARS
He spent his early childhood at his Portuguese grandmother’s boarding house ín a small town on the shore of San Francisco Bay. After his mother remarried, he lived on a rural farm in the foothills of Los Gatos. When his mother became ill he was sent away to a boarding school/orphanage located in a former prison near Monterey. Throughout the 1960s he participated in many of the eras major social and political events, including anti-Vietnam War protests.
EDUCATION
Sanchez received a Master’s Degree in Creative writing from San Francisco State University in 1967. He went on to teach there until the violent Student-Teacher Strike and the occupation of the campus by SWAT teams. He left the U.S. with his young wife and infant daughter with no tickets home, to an isolated Andalusian village in Spain to write his novel, Rabbit Boss, a 100-year saga of a California Indian Tribe begun when he worked on cattle ranches in the Sierra Nevada Mountains. 
CALIFORNIA YEARS
Sanchez returned to the U.S. in the early 1970s and moved to a remote adobe hacienda in the mountains above Santa Barbara, California, where he completed the last edit of Rabbit Boss Upon its publication in 1973, it was greeted as an important California novel. In 1978 Sanchez published his second novel, Zoot-Suit Murders, set in Los Angeles during World War II. 
KEY WEST YEARS
In the decade of the 1980s Sanchez lived in Key West, Florida and traveled from there throughout the American tropics. His experiences there found their way into his third published novel, Mile Zero, that was met with critical acclaim.
EUROPEAN YEARS
Throughout the 1990s Sanchez lived in Paris, Provence, and Mallorca, the settings for his fourth novel, Day of the Bees, a saga encompassing a fifty-year history from the onset of World War II to modern times. 
2st CENTURY
In the beginning of the 21st century Sanchez returned to the tropics for his fifth novel, King Bongo. It is set against the glamor and intrigue of pre-revolutionary 1950s Havana.  He then returned to Key West for his sixth novel, American Tropic(2013).
FILM WORK
Parallel to his writings, Sanchez has written and developed numerous screen plays based on his novels with producers such as Francis Ford Coppola and Ken Burns. He also wrote and directed in Paris a narrative feature film, Keep Calm and Carry on.

His first novel, Rabbit Boss, was named one of the 100 Greatest Western novels by the San Francisco Chronicle.
Sanchez is published by Knopf/Vintage at Random House.

Works

Novels 
 Rabbit Boss (1973)
 Zoot-Suit Murders (1978)
 Mile Zero (1989) 
 Day of the Bees (2000)
 King Bongo (2003) 
 American Tropic (2013)

Honors
He was the recipient of a 1980 Guggenheim Fellowship and the Chevalier des Arts et des Lettres from the French Republic.

References

External links
 1989 Interview with George Murphy in Littoral, the journal of the Key West Literary Seminar
 Author website
 Wired for Books interview with Don Swaim
 

1943 births
Living people
People from the San Francisco Bay Area
20th-century American novelists
21st-century American novelists
American male novelists
American mystery writers
Western (genre) writers
Writers from California
Novelists from Florida
20th-century American male writers
21st-century American male writers
Chevaliers of the Ordre des Arts et des Lettres